The 2012 ANZAC test was a rugby league test match played between Australia and New Zealand at Eden Park on 20 April 2012. It was the 13th Anzac test played between the two nations.

Australian five-eighth, Johnathan Thurston scored a try and kicked four goals from four attempts, and was named man-of-the-match.

English referee Richard Silverwood's performance drew criticism in the media.

Squads

Match Summary

References

External links

Anzac Test
Rugby league in Auckland
International rugby league competitions hosted by New Zealand
Anzac Test
Anzac Test